St Cybi's Church is a medieval church near the Roman Caer Gybi in Holyhead, Anglesey, Wales. The church was Grade I listed in January 1968. The original church was constructed at Holyhead around 540 AD by St Cybi, a cousin of St David. The church was sacked by Viking invaders in the 10th century and damaged again in 1405 by Henry IV's invading force. The present church was built in the 13th century and stands near the Roman fort in Holyhead.

History
The original church on an early Christian monastic settlement was established at Holyhead around 540 AD by St Cybi, a cousin of St David. Cybi chose to build his monastery within the walls of a ruined Roman fort. In the 10th century the original church was sacked by Viking raiders. In 1405, it was damaged by Henry IV's troops, who invaded Anglesey from Ireland as part of Henry's efforts to put down Owain Glyndŵr's rebellion.

The present church of St Cybi's was built in between the 13th to 16th centuries and stands near the walls of the Roman Caer Gybi. The chancel is one of the oldest parts of the church, dating to the 13th century. In 1897 a chapel designed by  British architect Hamo Thornycroft was added to the south. Further renovations were undertaken in the 20th century. A  sun dial with the inscription "Yr hoedl ar hyd ei haros a dderfydd yn nydd ac yn nos", which translates to "Life though long it stay will end in night and day", is located on the south transept. Ornamental figures are located  throughout the church, both inside and out.

References

External links

Grade I listed churches in Anglesey
Holyhead